Kim Sung-Min  (born 19 April 1985) is a South Korean footballer who plays as a forward for Maharlika Manila  in the Philippines Football League.

Club career

Davao Aguilas
In January 2018, Kim joined Philippines Football League club Davao Aguilas. On 21 April, he scored his first goal for Davao in a 3–2 win over JPV Marikina. On 16 June, he scored a brace against Stallion Laguna in a 5–0 victory. Kim ended the season with eight league goals, and Davao Aguilas finished third in the league.

In the Copa Paulino Alcantara, Kim scored a brace in Davao's last group match, a 4–0 win against Stallion Laguna. On 21 October, he scored four goals in a 6–1 thrashing of JPV Marikina in the semi-final. Davao eventually lost to Kaya in the final. After the 2018 season, Davao Aguilas folded and released all its players.

References

External links 

1985 births
Living people
Association football forwards
South Korean footballers
Ulsan Hyundai FC players
Ulsan Hyundai Mipo Dockyard FC players
Gwangju FC players
Gimcheon Sangmu FC players
Chungju Hummel FC players
K League 1 players
K League 2 players
Korea National League players